This Is Nat King Cole is an original compilation album by Nat King Cole. It was released in 1957 by Capitol Records. The LP collection reached  #18 on the Billboard  Magazine album chart.

Track listing 
"Dreams Can Tell A Lie" (Howard Barnes, Harold Cornelius, Dominic John) - 2:59
"I Just Found Out About Love" (Harold Adamson, Jimmy McHugh) - 2:47
"Too Young To Go Steady" (Harold Adamson, Jimmy McHugh) - 2:55
"Forgive My Heart" (Chester Conn, Sammy Gallop) - 3:02
"Annabelle" - 3:23
"Nothing Ever Changes My Love For You" - 2:39
"To The Ends Of The Earth" (Joe Sherman, Noel Sherman) - 2:19
"I'm Gonna Laugh You Right Out Of My Life" (Cy Coleman, Carolyn Leigh) - 3:18
"Someone You Love" - 2:54
"Love Me As Though There Were No Tomorrow" (Harold Adamson, Jimmy McHugh) - 2:35
"That's All" (Alan Brandt, Bob Hayes) - 2:59
"Never Let Me Go" (Jay Livingston) - 2:58
Bonus tracks added to later CD re-issue:
"Small Towns Are Smile Towns" - 2:45
"Don't Hurt the Girl" - 3:21 
"My Flaming Heart" (Nicholas Brodszky, Leo Robin) - 2:48
"United" (Geoffrey Parsons) - 3:17

Personnel 
 Nat King Cole - Vocals

References 
Capitol Records T 870 
A Pile o' Cole Nat King Cole Website

1957 albums
Nat King Cole albums
Albums arranged by Nelson Riddle
Capitol Records albums